Sagajeong Station is a station on the Seoul Subway Line 7.

Station layout

Railway stations opened in 1996
Seoul Metropolitan Subway stations
Metro stations in Jungnang District